Çınar is a district of Diyarbakır Province of Turkey. Its population is 74,207 according to Turkish government statistics as of 2018.

In the local elections 2019 Bedri Kaya was elected Mayor. Selami Kaya was appointed District Governor.

Neighbourhoods

Aktepe 
Akçomak 
Alabaş 
Alancık 
Altınakar 
Arafat  
Avdalı  
Ayveri 
Ağaçsever 
Aşağıkonak 
Aşağımollaali  
Ballıbaba
Bayırkonağı 
Bağacık 
Başaklı 
Başalan 
Belenli 
Bellitaş 
Beneklitaş 
Beşpınar 
Bilmece 
Biramehmetağa 
Bozçalı 
Boğazören 
Bulutçeker  
Buyuransu
Demirölçek  
Dikmencik
Dişlibaşak  
Düzova
Ekinveren
Filizören  
Göktepe
Görece
Gümüştaş
Gürses 
Halkapınar
Halıören  
Harabe
Hasköy
Höyükdibi
Karababa
Karabudak
Karalar
Karasungur
Karaçevre  
Kazıktepe  
Kubacık
Kuruyazı
Kutluk  
Kuyuluhöyük  
Köksalan
Kürekli
Kılıçkaya
Kırkağaç
Leblebitaş  
Meydanköy
Muratcık  
Ortaşar  
Ovabağ  
Pembeviran
Piremehmetağa
Selyazı  
Sevindik
Solmaz
Soğansuyu  
Sürendal  
Sırımkesen  
Taşhelvası  
Tekkaynak
Tilver  
Toraman
Uzgider
Yaprakbaşı
Yarımkaş  
Yazçiçeği  
Yeşilbağ
Yeşiltaş
Yukarıortaören
Yuvacık
Yıllarca  
Çakırkaya
Çakırtutmaz
Çataltarla 
Çeltikaltı  
Çukurbaşı 
Çömçeli
Çınar, Diyarbakır]]
Çınarköy
Öncülü  
Özgider
Özyar  
İnanöz  
İncirtepe  
Şekerören 
Şeyhçoban
Şükürlü

References

 
Kurdish settlements in Turkey
Populated places in Diyarbakır Province